The Mulde formation is a sequence of Silurian bluish-gray marlstone and agrillceous limestones found on the southwestern part of the island of Gotland. It generally becomes harder and less marly in the upper parts of the formation.

Fossil content 
The formation holds some of the best fossils on Gotland, being the best place to find well preserved trilobites. Some examples are Calymene, Dalmanites, Encrinurus and Proteus. Ostracods (beyrichids etc.), brachiopods (Atrypa reticularis, Leptaena, Eospirifer etc.), bryozoans and tentaculitids are also relatively common while corals, grapolites, annelids and cephalopods are more rare.

See also 
 Geology of Gotland

References 

Geologic formations of Sweden
Silurian Sweden
Gorstian
Marl formations
Limestone formations
Paleontology in Sweden
Formations
Geography of Gotland County